Bridges is the fourth studio album to be released by hard rock band Cavo. It was released independently on January 29, 2016. It was released digitally a couple of weeks before the official release on PledgeMusic. 
 
The band had joined Meg Myers and Yellawolf for a sold out show in their hometown of St. Louis, Missouri on October 23, 2015. Cavo will be celebrating and promoting the new album's release with a hometown show on January 29 at The Ready Room in St. Louis, Missouri.

Background
In January 2015, the band have announced that they will start recording their album in Austin, Texas with bass guitarist of rock band Blue October Matt Noveskey.
 
The band named the album "Bridges" because they felt like they had crossed over to someplace new, whereas the album cover depicts a bridge. Lead singer Casey Walker explains; This record is completely ours. If other people like it, great. If they don't, that's fine too. The fans will understand this record, and we feel we have to honor their support by creating something that is 100% Cavo. They would see right through it if we didn't.

Track listing

Personnel

Cavo
Casey Walker – lead vocals, lyrics
Chris Hobbs – guitars, piano, backing vocals, lyrics
Brian Smith – bass, backing vocals, lyrics
Andy Herrin – drums, percussion, lyrics

Additional musicians
Ryan Dellahousaye – strings
Miggy Milla – background vocals
Matt Noveskey – background vocals, additional percussion
Kelsie Watts – background vocals

Gang vocals
 Reed Turner, Malia Livolsi, Casie Luong, Miggy Milla, Jody McCormick, Alyssa Ehrhard, Daniel Corder, Malee Bringardner, Kat Whitlock

Production
Matt Noveskey – producer
Kato Khandwala – mixer
Fred Kevorkian – mastering
Kevin Butler – engineer
Robert Sewell – engineer
Caleb Contreras – additional engineer
Drew Millay – additional engineer

Design
Rollow Welch – art direction
C.C. Crow – artwork

References

 

2016 albums
Cavo albums